Raúl Athos Landini (July 14, 1909 – September 29, 1988) was an Argentine boxer who competed in the 1928 Summer Olympics.

He was born in Buenos Aires.

In 1928 he won the silver medal in the welterweight class after losing the final against Ted Morgan.

1928 Olympic results 
Below is the record of Raul Landini, an Argentine welterweight boxer who competed at the 1928 Amsterdam Olympics:

Round of 32: Defeated Thomas Lown (United States) on points
Round of 16: Defeated Valter Palm (Estonia) on points
Quarterfinal: Defeated Cor Blommers (Netherlands) on points
Semifinal: Defeated Raymond Smillie (Canada) on points
Final: Lost to Ted Morgan (New Zealand) on points (was awarded silver medal)

References
 profile

1909 births
1988 deaths
Boxers from Buenos Aires
Welterweight boxers
Olympic boxers of Argentina
Boxers at the 1928 Summer Olympics
Olympic silver medalists for Argentina
Olympic medalists in boxing
Burials at La Chacarita Cemetery
Argentine male boxers
Medalists at the 1928 Summer Olympics